Ushavadata (Brahmi:), also known as Rishabhadatta, was a viceroy and son-in-law of the Western Kshatrapa ruler Nahapana, who ruled in western India.

Name

Inscriptions 

Much of the information about Ushavadata comes from his Nashik and Karle inscriptions. The Nashik inscription contains an eulogy of Ushavadata in Sanskrit, and then records the donation of a cave to Buddhists in a Middle Indo-Aryan language. The Karle inscription contains a similar eulogy, but in the Middle Indo-Aryan language.

Early life 

Ushavadata was the son of one Dinika. He identifies as a Shaka (IAST: Śaka) in his Nashik inscription:

He believed in Brahmanism, and married Nahapana's daughter Dakshamitra.

Charity 

Both of Ushavadata's inscriptions mention the following of his charitable acts:

 Donated 300,000 cows
 Donated gold for the establishment of a holy site on the banks of the Barnasa river
 Donated 16 villages to the deities and Brahmanas (priests)
 Gave 8 wives to the Brahmanas at the holy site of Prabhasa
 Fed hundreds of thousands of Brahmanas every year

The Nashik inscription records more such acts, stating that Ushavadata exhibited very pious behaviour at the Trirashmi hills, where the Nashik caves are located:

 Donated four-roomed rest houses in Bharukachchha (Bharuch), Dashapura (Mandsaur), Govardhana (near Nashik), and Shurparaka (Nala Sopara)
 Commissioned gardens, tanks, and wells
 Established free crossings at several rivers, including Iba, Parada, Damana, Tapi, Karabena, Dahanuka, and Nava
 Established public water stations on both the banks of these rivers
 Donated 32,000 coconut tree stems at Nanamgola village to the associations of charakas at Pimditakavada, Govardhana, Suvarnamukha, and Shurparaka
 Purchased a field from a Brahmana family, and donated it to Buddhists along with a rock-cut cave (one of the Nasik Caves).

Military career 

Ushavadatta campaigned in the north under the orders of Nahapana to rescue the Uttamabhadras, who had been attacked by the Malayas (identified with the Malavas). He also extended the realm by defeating other enemies.

The Satavahana king Gautamiputra Satakarni appears to have defeated Rishabhadatta. An inscription discovered in Nashik, dated to the 18th year of Gautamiputra's reign, states that he donated a piece of land to Buddhist monks; this land was earlier in the possession of Ushavadata.

See also
 Nasik inscription of Ushavadata

References

Bibliography 

 
 
 
 

2nd-century Indian people
Year of birth missing
Year of death missing
Converts to Hinduism
Western Satraps